The 1979 Furman Paladins football team was an American football team that represented Furman University as a member of the Southern Conference (SoCon) during the 1979 NCAA Division I-A football season. In their second year under head coach Dick Sheridan, the Paladins compiled an overall record of 5–6 with a conference mark of 4–3, placing fourth in the SoCon.

Schedule

References

Furman
Furman Paladins football seasons
Furman Paladins football